Ash-cum-Ridley is a civil parish in the Sevenoaks district of Kent, England.  According to the 2001 census the parish had a population of 7,070, reducing to 6,641 at the 2011 Census.  

The parish includes four main settlements:
 Ash is a small village including the London Golf Club.
 New Ash Green, a planned settlement
 Hodsoll Street is a hamlet including the Green Man pub
 Ridley, another small village.

New Street is another hamlet, east of Ridley and north of Hodsoll Street; OS grid reference TQ6264.

Ash and Ridley were formerly separate parishes. Both were part of Dartford Rural District and Axstane Hundred.

Gallery

References

External links

 Ash-cum-Ridley Parish Council
 Ridley Parish Church
 Ash Cricket Club

Civil parishes in Kent
Sevenoaks District